The Wii Shop Channel is a former digital distribution service for the Wii video game console. The service allowed users to purchase and play additional software for the Wii (called Channels), including exclusive games (branded WiiWare), and games from prior generations of video games (marketed with the Virtual Console brand). The Wii Shop Channel launched on November 19, 2006, and ceased service operations worldwide on January 30, 2019. As of February 1, 2019, all previously purchased content could still be re-downloaded indefinitely or Wii data can be transferred from a Wii to a Wii U (via the Wii U Transfer Tool).

Succeeded by the Nintendo eShop, the Wii Shop Channel was accessible on the original Wii and on the Wii U console via Wii Mode, supporting the download of WiiWare titles, as well as legacy Virtual Console titles that are yet to be available via the Nintendo eShop.

Wii Points
Wii Points were the currency used in transactions on the Wii Shop Channel. Wii Points were obtained by either redeeming Wii Points Cards purchased from retail outlets (100–2,000 in the US; 1,000–3,000 in Japan) or directly through the Wii Shop Channel using a Mastercard or Visa credit card (1,000, 2,000, 3,000, 4,000, or 5,000 Wii Points depending with the number of dollars). In 2008, Club Nintendo in Europe began offering Wii Points in exchange for "stars" received from registering games and consoles on the website. To purchase and play Virtual Console games, Wii Shop Channel users would have to fund their account with Wii Points. On March 26, 2018, the ability to add Wii Points (with either a credit card or Wii Points card) worldwide was permanently removed following a temporary maintenance notice. This prevented users to purchase and play WiiWare and/or Virtual Console games unless if they had enough Wii Points in their account balance already. Already purchased software could still be downloaded (purchased and played), and any existing Wii Point credit were redeemable until January 30, 2019.

Virtual Console

Virtual Console was a brand that included games from past video game consoles, which ran under emulation. There were over 300 games available in North America and, as of December 31, 2007, over 10 million games have been downloaded worldwide. All games are exact replicas of the originals with no updated features or graphics, with the exception of Pokémon Snap, which was updated to allow in-game pictures to be posted to the Wii Message Board. New games were added weekly at 9 A.M. Pacific Time every Thursday (previously every Monday) in North America, Tuesdays in Japan and South Korea, and Fridays in Europe, Australia and New Zealand.

In Europe and North America, the Virtual Console featured several import titles which were not previously made available in those respective territories, such as Mario's Super Picross. These games cost 100–300 more points than the normal price due to their import status and some translation work.

Consoles included both Nintendo systems, such as the NES, SNES and N64, and non-Nintendo systems, such as the Sega Genesis, Master System, TurboGrafx-16, MSX, Neo Geo and Commodore 64 (Europe and North America only). Each system had a base starting price for games on that system. All titles ranged from 500 to 1200 Wii Points.

If a person using the now defunct Connection Ambassador Programme reached Gold status (Helped 10 people to connect), they would be able to download any Nintendo-published NES game free of charge. Additionally, if they reached Platinum (helped 20 people to connect), they would be able to download any NES, SNES and N64 game in the Virtual console free of charge.

WiiWare

The WiiWare section featured original games specifically designed for Wii. Games were priced between 500 and 1500 points. To decrease the size of the games, instruction manuals were hosted on each game's Wii Shop Channel page. Some titles featured additional downloadable content, priced from 100 to 800 points, that could be purchased using Wii Points in game or from the game's page.

The first WiiWare games were made available on March 25, 2008, in Japan, on May 12, 2008, in North America, and on May 20, 2008, in Europe.

Wii Channels

The Wii Channels section featured additional non-game channels that can be downloaded and used on Wii.

Before the WiiConnect24 service was discontinued, there were three free Channels offered worldwide: the Everybody Votes Channel, the Check Mii Out Channel (Mii Contest Channel in Europe), and the Nintendo Channel. An update to the Photo Channel (Photo Channel 1.1) is also available, if not preinstalled. A fourth Channel, the Internet Channel, a web browser based on Opera, was available worldwide originally for 500 Wii Points but was free as of September 1, 2009. Anyone who paid the 500 Wii Points for the Internet Channel has been refunded. There were also two exclusive free Japanese channels: the Television Friend Channel, which provides channel listing and recording reminder features, and the Digicam Print Channel, which allows users to order business cards and photo albums using photos stored on SD cards or the Photo Channel. Previously, a preview channel for Metroid Prime 3: Corruption was available for free in the fall of 2007 for North America and PAL regions before it was removed from the Wii Shop Channel several months after the game's launch. In North America and Europe, the Netflix channel was available in the Wii Channels section, along with Crunchyroll.

The Wii Channels section in the Wii Shop Channel was originally under the name of WiiWare in North America and Wii Software in Europe, before moving to its own dedicated space when WiiWare launched. These Wii Channels were unavailable on the Wii U console.

Downloading
Software downloaded from the Wii Shop Channel is saved onto the Wii console's internal memory. After a download is complete, the new software appears on the Wii Menu as a channel. Software can be copied to SD cards or re-downloaded for free. Wii consoles with system software version 4.0 can download software directly to SD cards.

On December 10, 2007, a gift feature was added to the Wii Shop Channel, allowing users to purchase and send games and channels to others as gifts. The receiving user was given the option to download or reject the gift upon opening the Wii Shop Channel, with a notification being sent out to the send if it was accepted. If a user already had the game or if the user did not choose to accept the gift within 45 days, then the gift expired and the Wii Points are returned to the sender. The feature was region locked and incompatible with the Wii U's Nintendo eShop.

Game updates
Downloaded games can receive updates from the Wii Shop Channel. This has been done four times so far to update Military Madness, Star Fox 64/Lylat Wars, Kirby 64: The Crystal Shards (in North America and Europe), and Mario Kart 64 (in Europe and Australia). Several NES and SNES games released before March 30, 2007 have also been given updates in Europe and Australia to fix previous problems with the Wii component cables. These updates are free of charge to those who have downloaded a previous version of the game. Some WiiWare games have also featured free updates for the purposes of fixing bugs. These games include Dr. Mario Online Rx and Alien Crush Returns.

Connection Ambassador Promotion
In 2009, Nintendo of Europe announced the "Connection Ambassador Promotion", a scheme designed to reward users for helping other new users get connected online and to the Wii Shop Channel. Both users (The Ambassador and the person who was helped) received a reward of 500 Wii Points each time the ambassador helped someone get online. If the ambassador assisted 20 people, the ambassador would have accumulated 10,000 Wii Points from the programme while attaining Platinum status and be able to download all NES, SNES and N64 titles from the Virtual Console section of the Wii Shop Channel free of charge. The service also launched in New Zealand and Australia. Since the service launched in 2009 the scheme had proved hugely popular with many sites appearing online dedicated to helping connect users and share system codes. This service remained exclusive for PAL version Wii consoles.

The programme ended on November 21, 2012.

Discontinuation

On September 29, 2017, Nintendo announced that the Wii Shop Channel would be discontinued on January 30, 2019 (limiting usage of the service to redownload previously purchased content only and that the service would become entirely inaccessible at an unspecified date that year). To prepare for the closure, it was announced that the ability to add Wii Points with a credit card or a Wii Points card (to purchase and play VC games and/or WiiWare) on Wii Shop Channel would be removed on March 26, 2018. Then from that date, the ability to add Wii Points --to purchase and play VC games-- remained functional and Wii Shop Channel users could still continue adding Wii Points until March 26, 2018 (until 1 P.M PST on March 26, 2018). 

On March 26, 2018, the Wii Shop Channel was updated to remove the ability to add Wii Points – with a credit card or a Wii Points card – to purchase and play VC games and/or WiiWare (in preparation for its shutdown in the following year). This was at 1 PM for PST. Beginning on that date, Wii Shop Channel users were no longer able to purchase Wii Points and add them to accounts so they could purchase and play VC games and/or WiiWare. This prevented them to add Wii Points (and purchase and play VC games and/or WiiWare) unless they had enough Wii Points in their account balance. Afterwards, the Wii Shop Channel (from that date) remained functional until January 29, 2019.

Finally on January 30, 2019, Nintendo – at 6 am PST – shut down the Wii Shop Channel (after 12 years of being around on Wii systems – since its launch along with the release of Wii). They removed all WiiWare, Virtual Console games, and other Wii Channels from sale and/or initial download. The only exceptions are the save data update channel for The Legend of Zelda: Skyward Sword, the Wii U Transfer Tool channel (on Wii consoles), and the Wii System Transfer channel (from the Wii U's Wii Mode on Wii U consoles). It is now impossible to purchase and play new content as of Feb. 1, 2019. However, users can still continue re-downloading previously purchased content they have acquired (prior to the shutdown date) and/or transfer Wii data from a Wii to a Wii U via the Wii U Transfer Tool. (That is, if it – the Wii U Transfer Tool – is purchased from the Wii Shop Channel.) The ability to re-download previously purchased content and/or transfer Wii data from a Wii to a Wii U is going to continue until an unknown date. On the day of the closure, the shop's main UI has been updated to show its original 2006 layout as it appeared when the channel first launched back on November 19, 2006 (removing the WiiWare option entirely).

Japanese users were able to transfer or refund any remaining Wii Points after the shutdown date from February 21, 2019, until August 31, 2019. The refunded points could be transferred to a local bank account or received as a refund from a convenience store.

In popular culture
Throughout the channel’s lifetime --and as of February 1, 2019-- the channel's theme music has become popular and well-received on the internet and has also been used in internet memes, even well after the channel shut down its service in 2019 (though Wii Shop Channel users are still able to continue redownloading previously purchased content and/or --with the Wii U Transfer Tool-- transfering Wii data over from a Wii to a Wii U --and is the only thing they can do now on the channel, but can no longer purchase and play new software).

See also
Nintendo eShop
Xbox Games Store
PlayStation Store
Steam
Lists of Virtual Console games
Lists of PS one Classics
List of WiiWare games
List of downloadable PlayStation games
WiiWare
Xbox Live Arcade

References

Delisted digital-only games
Online-only retailers of video games
Wii
Retail companies established in 2006
Internet properties established in 2006
Products and services discontinued in 2019
Retail companies disestablished in 2019
Internet properties disestablished in 2019
Video games scored by Kazumi Totaka

es:Wii Channels#Wii Shop Channel
sv:Wii Channels#Wii Shop Channel
ts:Wii Channels#Wii Shop Channel